Growth regulation by estrogen in breast cancer-like is a protein that in humans is encoded by the GREB1L gene.

References

Further reading